The Government Law College, Thiruchirappalli is one of seven government law colleges in the state of Tamil Nadu, India. Like the rest of the law colleges in Tamil Nadu, it is administered by Tamil Nadu's Department of Legal Studies, and affiliated to Tamil Nadu Dr. Ambedkar Law University.

The Tiruchirappalli college was opened in 1979, the same year as the Coimbatore college, joining existing government law colleges at Chennai and Madurai.

The college has undergraduate and graduate programs, and maintains a hostel for girl students.

Law schools in Tamil Nadu
Universities and colleges in Tiruchirappalli
Educational institutions established in 1979
1979 establishments in Tamil Nadu
Academic institutions formerly affiliated with the University of Madras